Julia Dujmovits (born 12 June 1987) is an Austrian snowboarder.

Dujmovits won silver in the parallel giant slalom at the 2013 FIS Snowboarding World Championships. She won a gold in the same discipline at the 2013 Winter Universiade.  At the Sochi Olympics in 2014, she became the first Austrian to win gold in snowboarding. She was present at the Kaprun Funicular Disaster on 11 November 2000, a fire which claimed the lives of 155 people including Julia's friends and teammates. "Since there was a snowboarding event on that day and a big line at the cable railway, my brother suggested taking the gondola instead, a decision which ultimately saved our lives."

World Cup results
All results are sourced from the International Ski Federation (FIS).

Season standings

Race podiums
 3 wins – (2 PGS, 1 PSL)
 21 podiums – (13 PGS, 8 PSL)

Olympic results

World Championships results

References

External links

1987 births
Living people
Austrian female snowboarders
People from Güssing
Burgenland Croats
Snowboarders at the 2014 Winter Olympics
Snowboarders at the 2018 Winter Olympics
Snowboarders at the 2022 Winter Olympics
Olympic snowboarders of Austria
Medalists at the 2014 Winter Olympics
Olympic gold medalists for Austria
Olympic medalists in snowboarding
Austrian people of Croatian descent
Universiade medalists in snowboarding
Universiade gold medalists for Austria
Competitors at the 2013 Winter Universiade
Sportspeople from Burgenland
Competitors at the 2015 Winter Universiade